Eathan Bosch (born 27 April 1998) is a South African professional cricketer. He made his first-class debut for KwaZulu-Natal in the 2016–17 Sunfoil 3-Day Cup on 12 January 2017. He made his List A debut for KwaZulu-Natal in the 2016–17 CSA Provincial One-Day Challenge on 12 February 2017. He made his Twenty20 debut for Dolphins in the 2017–18 Ram Slam T20 Challenge on 12 November 2017.

In July 2018, he was named in the Cricket South Africa Emerging Squad. In September 2018, he was named in KwaZulu-Natal's squad for the 2018 Africa T20 Cup. The following month, he was named in Paarl Rocks' squad for the first edition of the Mzansi Super League T20 tournament. He was the leading wicket-taker for Dolphins in the 2018–19 CSA 4-Day Franchise Series, with 31 dismissals in nine matches.

In September 2019, he was named in the squad for the Jozi Stars team for the 2019 Mzansi Super League tournament. In April 2021, he was named in KwaZulu-Natal's squad, ahead of the 2021–22 cricket season in South Africa.

References

External links
 

1998 births
Living people
South African cricketers
Dolphins cricketers
KwaZulu-Natal cricketers
Paarl Rocks cricketers
Pretoria Capitals cricketers
Place of birth missing (living people)